Alex Nicholas Gilliead (born 11 February 1996) is an English professional footballer who plays as a midfielder for Bradford City. He has represented England at under-16, under-17, under-18, and under-20 levels.

Club career

Newcastle United
Born in Shotley Bridge, County Durham, Gilliead was offered a trial by Newcastle United in 2011, after he was first noticed playing for Swalwell Juniors. He signed scholarship terms in the summer of 2012, before signing a three-year professional contract with the club on 4 July 2013. Gilliead signed a new two-and-a-half-year contract on 28 January 2016 to keep him at the club until 30 June 2018, with the option of a further year.

Loan to Carlisle United
On 14 September 2015, Gilliead joined League Two club Carlisle United on a one-month youth loan. He made his professional debut five days later in a 2–2 draw with York City, assisting both of Carlisle's goals. Gilliead's loan was extended until the end of 2015–16, having made five appearances during his initial loan spell. He followed up his loan extension by scoring his first professional goal two days later in a 1–0 win at home to Exeter City. Gilliead completed the loan spell with 41 appearances and five goals.

Loan to Luton Town
On 31 August 2016, Gilliead joined League Two club Luton Town on loan until 7 January 2017. He debuted as an 85th-minute substitute in a 2–1 defeat at home to Grimsby Town on 10 September. Gilliead scored his first goal for Luton in a 2–0 win at home to West Bromwich Albion U21 in the EFL Trophy on 4 October. He later scored his first league goal for the club in a 3–1 win at home to Barnet on 31 December. Gilliead scored two goals in 21 appearances and returned to Newcastle following the expiration of his loan spell.

Loan to Bradford City
On 12 January 2017, Gilliead signed for League One club Bradford City on loan until the end of 2016–17. He made his debut two days later as a 76th-minute substitute in a 1–0 defeat away to Shrewsbury Town and completed the loan spell with 10 appearances.

Gilliead returned to Bradford City on a six-month loan on 7 July 2017. On 4 January 2018, Gilliead's loan at Bradford was extended until the end of the season. He scored two goals from 48 appearances, as Bradford finished in 11th place in the table.

Shrewsbury Town
Gilliead signed for League One club Shrewsbury Town on 10 July 2018 on a two-year contract, following his release by Newcastle.

Scunthorpe United
Gilliead signed for Scunthorpe United, who were newly relegated to League Two, on 9 July 2019 on a two-year contract for an undisclosed fee. He was one of 17 players released by Scunthorpe at the end of the 2020–21 season.

Return to Bradford City
Gilliead rejoined Bradford City, this time on a permanent basis, in the summer of 2021. His first Bradford goal since 2018 came in a 2-0 home win over Rochdale on 2 October 2021.

International career
Gilliead has represented England at under-16, under-17, under-18, and under-20 levels.

Career statistics

References

External links

1996 births
Living people
Sportspeople from Consett
Footballers from County Durham
English footballers
England youth international footballers
Association football forwards
Newcastle United F.C. players
Carlisle United F.C. players
Luton Town F.C. players
Bradford City A.F.C. players
Shrewsbury Town F.C. players
Scunthorpe United F.C. players
English Football League players
People from Shotley Bridge